Roy Brocksmith (September 15, 1945 – December 16, 2001) was an American actor.

Life and career
Brocksmith was born in Quincy, Illinois, the son of Vera Marguerite (née Hartwig) and Otis E. Brocksmith, who was a mechanic. He graduated from Quincy University in 1970. He then moved to New York City where he began a career on Broadway. His roles included Louis XIII in The Three Musketeers and the balladeer in a revival of The Threepenny Opera with Raul Julia.

Brocksmith's nerdy, pudgy appearance, and effete mannerisms made him perfect for comic roles, particularly in the late '80s and 1990s. Among his more prominent roles are Dr. Edgemar in Total Recall, a police sergeant possessed by Bill in Bill & Ted's Bogus Journey, principal Michael Oslo in Picket Fences and jovial mortician Irv Kendall in Arachnophobia.

He died in 2001, aged 56, from complications of diabetes.

Filmography

Film

Television and guest roles

References

External links
 
 

1945 births
2001 deaths
American male film actors
American male television actors
Deaths from diabetes
Male actors from Illinois
Actors from Quincy, Illinois
20th-century American male actors